Purina One, styled as Purina ONE ("optimal nutrition enhancement"), is a brand of premium dog and cat food made by Nestlé Purina PetCare. Purina ONE foods typically contain some type of meat as their first named ingredient, while still containing by-products, grain fragments (such as brewers rice and corn gluten meal), and whole corn.

History

The brand was introduced in 1986 as Ralston Purina's first super-premium pet food. Products under the Purina One brand include Purina One Natural Blends, which use natural ingredients and were the first line of natural pet foods to have broad natural distribution in grocery and retail stores.

References

Cat food brands
Dog food brands
Ralston Purina products
Nestlé brands